Callimation pontificum is a species of beetle in the family Cerambycidae. It was described by James Thomson in 1857. It is known from Guinea and the Central African Republic.

References

Tragocephalini
Beetles described in 1857